Pathetic Being is the second studio album by the Polish death metal band Sceptic. It was released on  April 21, 2001 by Empire Records.

Track listing

Personnel

References

Sceptic (band) albums
2001 albums